Andrew Maynard (born April 8, 1964) is an American former professional boxer who competed from 1989 to 2000. As an amateur boxer, he won the Gold Medal in the Light Heavyweight division at the 1988 Summer Olympics in Seoul, South Korea.

Military service
Andrew Maynard, a 1982 graduate of Suitland High School in Prince George’s County, Maryland, joined the National Guard in 1985 after having competed in a limited number of amateur boxing contests in the year prior.  Maynard underwent his basic training at Fort Dix, New Jersey.  

Encouraged to join by his wife, Susan, he enlisted in the United States Army in the winter of 1986 where he engaged in boxing while assigned to be a cook stationed at Fort Carson, Colorado.  

Maynard was later reassigned to special duty with the Fort Carson boxing team after receiving the approval of his company commander to pursue his goal of competing in the 1988 Summer Olympics.  Maynard’s final military rank was specialist.

Amateur career
As an amateur boxer, Maynard was a relentless pressure fighter — often throwing 1,000 punches per bout.

He began his amateur career in the fall of 1984, surprising many onlookers as he won four consecutive bouts in a well-established amateur boxing tournament at the Ohio State Fair.

Maynard was the 1987 and 1988 United States Amateur Boxing Champion in the Light Heavyweight division (178 lbs.). He won the Bronze Medal at the 1987 Pan American Games, where he first burst into international prominence beating up on Cuban world champion Pablo Romero only to collapse in the second round without being hit. Later, Maynard acknowledged that he had suffered a broken ankle during a pickup basketball game the day before the Romero bout but didn't tell anybody about it. "I figure that I owed myself some kind of a gold medal after that situation," he said. So, at the 1988 Summer Olympics, Maynard methodically avoided all basketball courts in Seoul.

Pan Am Box-Offs (178 lbs.), International Center of the Broadmoor, Colorado Springs, Colorado, July 1987:
 Defeated Joseph Pemberton.

In the United States Olympic Box-Offs held from July 16–17, 1988 at Caesars Palace in Las Vegas, Nevada, Maynard had to earn a spot on the 1988 United States Olympic Boxing Team as the selected “most noteworthy opponent” by defeating fellow soldier Alfred “Ice” Cole in two bouts on consecutive nights.  The judges’ scores for each respective bout was 4-1 in favor of Maynard.

He was one of three amateur boxers — the other two being Kelcie Banks (125 lbs.) and Riddick “Big Daddy” Bowe (Super Hvt.) — who lost in the Olympic trials but made the 1988 United States Olympic Boxing Team by attaining two wins in the United States Olympic  Box-Offs.

Prior to competing in the United States Olympic Box-Offs, and since 1986, Maynard had won nine of ten boxing competitions — including the two national championships and an armed forces championship.  Subsequently, and deservedly so, the determined 24-year-old had developed a reputation as one of the United States’ best amateur boxers at that point in time with a relatively limited but deceiving 35-5 amateur boxing record.

Maynard went on to win the Light Heavyweight Gold Medal for the United States at the 1988 Summer Olympics in Seoul, South Korea — averaging an overwhelming 150 punches per round and culminating in the shutout of Nurmagomed Shanavazov, his Russian opponent, on points in the gold medal bout.  He dedicated his gold medal win in honor of his father, Theodore “Slim” Maynard.

This was a rematch between Maynard and Shanavazov, who competed against each other in the U.S.-U.S.S.R. Heavyweight Invitational held in June of 2017 in Richmond, Virginia.  In their first encounter, an action-packed battle, Maynard beat Shanavazov by a 2-1 decision. And in Shanavazov, the American beat an opponent who was the European champion and the World Cup champion in 1985 as well as the Goodwill Games champion in 1986.

Going on to obtain the highest prize in amateur boxing in Seoul was an amazing achievement for a boxer who picked up the gloves to train only four years earlier.

Results were: 
First round bye 
Defeated Mikaele Masoe (American Samoa) RSC 2 
Defeated Lajos Erős (Hungary) 5-0 
Defeated Henryk Petrich (Poland) TKO 3 
Defeated Nurmagomed Shanavazov (Soviet Union) 5-0.

Maynard worked on the inside against Shanavazov throughout the gold medal bout, with both fighters leaning against each other, and was relentless in beating the Russian to the punch.  He was successful in repeatedly throwing left hooks to the body in the first two rounds, while landing a hard right to the head of Shanavazov in the final round.

The light heavyweight competition in the 1988 Summer Olympics included boxers representing 26 countries.

Along with “King” Kennedy McKinney (Bantamweight division) and “Merciless” Ray Mercer (Heavyweight division), Maynard was one of three Americans to capture gold for the 1988 United States Olympic Boxing Team in Seoul.  He was the first American to win the Light Heavyweight Gold Medal since Leon Spinks in 1976.  Maynard is one of seven Americans to win the Light Heavyweight Gold Medal in the history of the Olympic Games, including Muhammad Ali in 1960.

Maynard received a hero’s welcome immediately upon his return to his home state of Maryland, as he was honored along with other Marylanders who participated in the 1988 Summer Olympics by both the Governor of Maryland and the Maryland Legislature at public ceremonies held at the Maryland State House in Annapolis, Maryland.  In typical Maynard fashion, and upon learning that a teacher in Arbutus, Maryland got up in the middle of the night to clean and repair the United States Olympic opening ceremony team jacket and pants that Maynard had damaged on the red eye plane flight from Colorado back to Maryland, he refused to attend the Annapolis celebrations scheduled later in the morning until he first paid a surprise visit to the teacher’s special education school to pose for photos with students in a makeshift boxing ring constructed with broom sticks and rope and with the theme song from “Rocky” resonating in the background.

Professional career
Following the Olympics, Maynard made the decision to move to Laurel, Maryland where he began his professional career by signing with the management team of “Sugar” Ray Leonard and Mike Trainer.

Maynard was one of five Olympic medalists making their professional debuts on February 24, 1989 in a boxing card held in Atlantic City, New Jersey.  He knocked out Zack Worthy at 2:49 of the first round.

Maynard, competing in the light heavyweight division (175 lbs), quickly became known for his hard hitting along with his outgoing personality and trademark smile.  Maynard’s classic one-punch “KO” of Arthur “Butch” Hall in August of 1989, a punch described in the live telecast as a “freight train right”, was featured on a video of “Boxing’s Greatest Hits.” His boxing monikers included “BAM” (“Boxing Andrew Maynard”) and “Smilin’ Drew”.

Maynard beat Mike Sedillo for the NABF Light Heavyweight Title by a majority decision on April 1, 1990 in Lake Tahoe, Nevada.  Although knocked down twice in the sixth round, Maynard consistently landed punches with both hands throughout the 12-round bout — outpunching Sedillo by a whopping 1,046 to 355 margin.

Maynard won his first 12 bouts prior to getting stopped in the seventh round by Bobby Czyz on June 24, 1990 in Atlantic City, New Jersey.  His apparent shift of training styles from that of a puncher to a boxer during this period was a subject of debate and discussion.

One of his following NABF title defenses of particular note came in June of 1991 against Ed “Mac Attack” Mack (13-1-1), with Maynard eventually stopping the game Philadelphian at 2:41 of the tenth round.  Mack, who had recently gained notoriety for upsetting highly regarded Booker T. Word in his last bout, was no match for his aggressive counterpart.

Maynard accumulated a six-fight winning streak, stopping former world light heavyweight champion Matthew Saad Muhammad in October of 1991 after a barrage of punches thrown over a little more than two rounds and setting up a bout with Frank Tate on January 10, 1992.  Tate dropped Maynard in the 11th round, prompting the referee to halt the action.  Maynard lost his championship belt to Tate after having successfully defending it on four occasions.

Maynard, who fought at 178 pounds as an amateur, had difficulty adjusting to the lower 175-pound light heavyweight limit on the pro level and eventually transitioned to the cruiserweight division.

Maynard moved up to cruiserweight to challenge WBC World Cruiserweight champion Anaclet Wamba in a title bout held in Paris, France on October 16, 1992.  Knocked down in the first round, the typically slow-starting American battled back courageously and lost by a 12-round unanimous decision with one judge having the bout as close as 113-116.

The championship bout versus Wamba was Maynard’s only world title opportunity and only his second bout scheduled in the cruiserweight division. Conceding five pounds at the weigh-in which occurred the day before, Maynard traded punches throughout the bout held the next night with what appeared to be a considerably bigger opponent and was effective at times in landing shots to the body of Wamba.  In a display of good sportsmanship by all, Maynard was invited to, and attended, Wamba’s victory party at the sponsor hotel and was well-received by the French fans in attendance.

After losing to Wamba, Maynard fought on in obscurity.  Among his notable fights which followed were a knockout loss to Thomas Hearns and a stoppage at heavyweight to Brian Nielsen.

Maynard retired in 2000 and lives in Harlingen, Texas with his common law wife, Cynthia Ann Montgomery.  For several years, Maynard served as a youth boxing trainer in Harlingen after being recruited for the position by the Harlingen Foundation for Valley Sports.  For a short period of time, he worked in a public relations capacity as “Ambassador of Boxing” for USA Boxing in Colorado Springs, Colorado.  Maynard is the proud father of three children.

In March 1996, the Country of Nicaragua issued a stamp in honor of Maynard and in his likeness.  He was inducted into the “Maryland State Athletic Hall of Fame” in 2001.  Maynard was a 2016 inductee of the “Washington, D.C. Boxing Hall of Fame” and, in 2019, was one of five members of the inaugural class of Texas’ “Rio Grande Valley Boxing Hall of Fame”.

Professional boxing record

|-
|align="center" colspan=8|26 Wins (21 knockouts, 5 decisions), 13 Losses (9 knockouts, 4 decisions), 1 Draw 
|-
| align="center" style="border-style: none none solid solid; background: #e3e3e3"|Result
| align="center" style="border-style: none none solid solid; background: #e3e3e3"|Record
| align="center" style="border-style: none none solid solid; background: #e3e3e3"|Opponent
| align="center" style="border-style: none none solid solid; background: #e3e3e3"|Type
| align="center" style="border-style: none none solid solid; background: #e3e3e3"|Round
| align="center" style="border-style: none none solid solid; background: #e3e3e3"|Date
| align="center" style="border-style: none none solid solid; background: #e3e3e3"|Location
| align="center" style="border-style: none none solid solid; background: #e3e3e3"|Notes
|-align=center
|Loss
|
|align=left| Gary "The Whip" Wilcox
|TKO
|10
|20/10/2000
|align=left| Albany, New York, U.S.
|align=left|
|-
|Win
|
|align=left| Tyler "Working Man" Hughes
|SD
|6
|29/04/2000
|align=left| Scottsbluff, Nebraska, U.S.
|align=left|
|-
|Loss
|
|align=left| John "Killer" Kiser
|TKO
|1
|05/02/2000
|align=left| Denver, Colorado, U.S.
|align=left|
|-
|Win
|
|align=left| Joe Escamilla
|TKO
|5
|25/09/1999
|align=left| Scottsbluff, Nebraska, U.S.
|align=left|
|-
|Draw
|
|align=left| Leon "Shades of" Gray
|PTS
|6
|29/07/1999
|align=left| Denver, Colorado, U.S.
|align=left|
|-
|Loss
|
|align=left| "Super" Brian Nielsen
|TKO
|6
|18/10/1996
|align=left| Vejle, Denmark
|align=left|
|-
|Loss
|
|align=left| Justin Fortune
|TD
|4
|29/05/1996
|align=left| Rochester, Washington, U.S.
|align=left|
|-
|Loss
|
|align=left| Torsten May
|KO
|10
|20/04/1996
|align=left| Düsseldorf, Germany
|align=left|
|-
|Loss
|
|align=left| Kenny Keene
|UD
|10
|13/03/1996
|align=left| Los Angeles, California, U.S.
|align=left|
|-
|Loss
|
|align=left| Sergei Kobozev
|TKO
|10
|27/08/1994
|align=left| Miami Beach, Florida, U.S.
|align=left|
|-
|Win
|
|align=left| Danny Wofford
|PTS
|8
|20/07/1994
|align=left| Raleigh, North Carolina, U.S.
|align=left|
|-
|Win
|
|align=left| Tim "Scrap Iron" Johnson
|TKO
|2
|11/05/1994
|align=left| Annandale, Virginia, U.S.
|align=left|
|-
|Win
|
|align=left| Alonzo Cutchins
|TKO
|1
|02/04/1994
|align=left| Richmond, Virginia, U.S.
|align=left|
|-
|Loss
|
|align=left| Thomas "Hitman" Hearns
|TKO
|1
|06/11/1993
|align=left| Las Vegas, Nevada, U.S.
|align=left|
|-
|Loss
|
|align=left| Egerton Marcus
|RTD
|8
|22/05/1993
|align=left| Washington, D.C., U.S.
|align=left|
|-
|Win
|
|align=left| Larry Davis
|KO
|2
|26/03/1993
|align=left| Erie, Pennsylvania, U.S.
|align=left|
|-
|Loss
|
|align=left| Eric Nicoletta
|UD
|10
|29/01/1993
|align=left| Nimes, France
|align=left|
|-
|Win
|
|align=left| Charles Price
|TKO - referee stoppage!
|7
|09/12/1992
|align=left| Virginia Beach, U.S.
|align=left|
|-
|Loss
|
|align=left| Anaclet Wamba
|UD
|12
|16/10/1992
|align=left| Bercy, France
|align=left|
|-
|Win
|
|align=left| Jeff McCall
|KO
|4
|29/08/1992
|align=left| Fredericksburg, Virginia, U.S.
|align=left|
|-
|Loss
|
|align=left| Frank Tate
|TKO
|11
|10/01/1992
|align=left| New York City, U.S.
|align=left|
|-
|Win
|
|align=left| Matthew Saad Muhammad
|TKO
|3
|29/10/1991
|align=left| Washington, D.C., U.S.
|align=left|
|-
|Win
|
|align=left| Ed Mack
|TKO
|10
|18/06/1991
|align=left| Washington, D.C., U.S.
|align=left|
|-
|Win
|
|align=left| Govoner Chavers
|TKO
|12
|20/04/1991
|align=left| Stateline, Nevada, U.S.
|align=left|
|-
|Win
|
|align=left| "Lightning" Lenzie Morgan
|TKO
|8
|26/02/1991
|align=left| Washington, D.C., U.S.
|align=left|
|-
|Win
|
|align=left| Robert Curry
|TKO
|5
|24/01/1991
|align=left| Owings Mills, Maryland, U.S.
|align=left|
|-
|Win
|
|align=left| Keith "Sir Jabalot" McMurray
|UD
|8
|25/10/1990
|align=left| Las Vegas, Nevada, U.S.
|align=left|
|-
|Loss
|
|align=left| Bobby "Matinee Idol" Czyz
|KO
|7
|24/06/1990
|align=left| Atlantic City, New Jersey, U.S.
|align=left|
|-
|Win
|
|align=left| Art Jimmerson
|RTD
|3
|29/04/1990
|align=left| Atlantic City, New Jersey, U.S.
|align=left|
|-
|Win
|
|align=left| Mike Sedillo
|MD
|12
|01/04/1990
|align=left| Stateline, Nevada, U.S.
|align=left|
|-
|Win
|
|align=left| Kemper Morton
|TKO
|3
|02/02/1990
|align=left| Las Vegas, Nevada, U.S.
|align=left|
|-
|Win
|
|align=left| Mike DeVito
|UD
|8
|07/12/1989
|align=left| Las Vegas, Nevada, U.S.
|align=left|
|-
|Win
|
|align=left| Carl "Little Truth" Williams
|TKO
|5
|12/09/1989
|align=left| Atlantic City, New Jersey, U.S.
|align=left|
|-
|Win
|
|align=left| Arthur "Butch" Hall
|KO
|5
|15/08/1989
|align=left| West Orange, New Jersey, U.S.
|align=left|
|-
|Win
|
|align=left| Greg Townes
|KO
|3
|15/07/1989
|align=left| Atlantic City, New Jersey, U.S.
|align=left|
|-
|Win
|
|align=left| "Cowboy" Stephen Schwann
|TKO
|1
|12/06/1989
|align=left| Las Vegas, Nevada, U.S.
|align=left|
|-
|Win
|
|align=left| John "King Bee" Keys
|TKO
|6
|22/05/1989
|align=left| Atlantic City, New Jersey, U.S.
|align=left|
|-
|Win
|
|align=left| Anthony Williams
|TKO
|2
|18/04/1989
|align=left| Atlantic City, New Jersey, U.S.
|align=left|
|-
|Win
|
|align=left| Rodney Brown
|TKO
|2
|25/03/1989
|align=left| Las Vegas, Nevada, U.S.
|align=left|
|-
|Win
|
|align=left| Zack Worthy
|TKO
|1
|24/02/1989
|align=left| Atlantic City, New Jersey, U.S.
|align=left|

References

External links
 

1964 births
Living people
African-American boxers
Boxers from Maryland
Boxers at the 1987 Pan American Games
Boxers at the 1988 Summer Olympics
Olympic boxers of the United States
Olympic gold medalists for the United States in boxing
Pan American Games bronze medalists for the United States
Winners of the United States Championship for amateur boxers
People from Laurel, Maryland
American male boxers
Medalists at the 1988 Summer Olympics
Pan American Games medalists in boxing
Light-heavyweight boxers
Medalists at the 1987 Pan American Games
21st-century African-American people
20th-century African-American sportspeople